59 is an album by Japanese pop duo Puffy, released in 2004. The album peaked at #62 on the Japanese Albums Chart.

Track listing
"Teen Titans Theme" 
"Sunrise" 
"Joining A Fan Club" 
"Kokoro ni Hana o"
"Kazemakase Futaritabi"
"Forever"
"So Long Zero"
"Teen Titans Theme" (Japanese Version)

References

Puffy AmiYumi albums
2004 albums